Babashafi Pathan (born 19 August 1994) is an Indian first-class cricketer who plays for Baroda. He made his List A debut for Baroda in the 2016–17 Vijay Hazare Trophy on 25 February 2017.

References

External links
 

1994 births
Living people
Indian cricketers
Baroda cricketers
People from Vadodara